Miss Vietnam 2020 was the 17th edition of the Miss Vietnam pageant. It was held on November 20, 2020 at Phu Tho Indoor Stadium, Ho Chi Minh City, Vietnam. Miss Vietnam 2018 Trần Tiểu Vy crowned her successor Đỗ Thị Hà at the end of the event.

The pageant crowned the Vietnam representatives to compete in four of international beauty pageants: Miss World 2021, Miss International 2022, Miss Grand International 2020 and Miss Intercontinental 2021.

Results

Placements
Color keys

Special awards

Fast Track Events

Beauty With A Purpose
The winner of Beauty With A Purpose would automatically advance to Top 5

Beach Beauty 
The winner of Beach Beauty would automatically advance to Top 10

Multimedia
The winner of Multimedia would automatically advance to Top 22

Popular Vote
The winner of Popular Vote would automatically advance to Top 22

Top Model

Sports

Tourism

Talent

Contestants
35 contestants in the final

Judges
The Miss Vietnam 2020 final judges were:

Dương Trung Quốc – Historian
Đỗ Mỹ Linh – Miss Vietnam 2016
Hà Kiều Anh – Miss Vietnam 1992
Nguyễn Thụy Vân – 2nd Runner-up of Miss Vietnam 2008
Trần Hữu Việt – Journalist
Hoàng Tử Hùng – Professor, doctor
Lê Thanh Hoà – Fashion designer

References

2020 beauty pageants
Beauty pageants in Vietnam
Vietnamese awards
November 2020 events in Vietnam